A list of science fiction films released in the 1990s. These films include core elements of science fiction, but can cross into other genres. They have been released to a cinema audience by the commercial film industry and are widely distributed with reviews by reputable critics.

Collectively, the science fiction films from the 1990s have received 13 Academy Awards, 15 Saturn Awards, five Hugo Awards, one Nebula Award and one Golden Globe Award. Four of these movies were the highest-grossing films of their respective years of release. However, these films also received 10 Golden Raspberry Awards.

List

See also
 History of science fiction films

Notes

References

Lists of 1990s films by genre
1990s